Living Water or Living Waters may refer to:

Living Water, a biblical term which appears in both the Old and New Testaments
Living Waters Lutheran College, Western Australia
Living Waters for the World, an organization helping to improve the water supply and sanitation in Haiti
Living Waters Publications, part of The Way of the Master ministry, USA
Living Water Books, a publisher of Mandaean books in Sydney, Australia
Living Water International (LWI), non-profit organization that helps communities in developing countries acquire safe water
Church of Living Water, Istanbul (Dirisu Kilisesi), Evangelical Christian church in Istanbul

See also
Water of Life (Christianity)